Vega 4 is an Australian science fiction television series which first screened on the ABC in 1968. It was later also screened on the Seven Network. Vega 4 is a spin-off of the 1966 series The Interpretaris. The third series in the trilogy was Phoenix Five in 1970.

Plot
A threat to Earth has been detected by Earth Space Control from Galaxy Five. When it is suggested that the spacecraft, the Interpretaris, should be sent on this mission, it is revealed that it is not equipped for travel to Galaxy Five. Therefore, the President orders the commissioning of an untested new spaceship the Vega 4, which is the only hope for Earth to survive.

Cast
John Faassen as Captain Wallace
Evan Dunstan as Lieutenant Adam
Juliana Allan as Ensign Poitier
Edward Hepple as Zodian
Ken Fraser as President
Philip Jay as Professor Kendrick

References

External links
Vega 4 at Australian television
Vega 4 at IMDb
Vega 4 at National Film and Sound Archive

Australian science fiction television series
Australian children's television series
1968 Australian television series debuts
English-language television shows